Jensen Noen (born ukr. Євген Ножечкін, April 20, 1987) is a Los Angeles-based director and writer. He was born in  Poltava, Ukraine.

Noen was named Best Director at the 2018 Mediterranean Film Festival Cannes and 2019 Flathead Lake International Cinemafest. He was also nominated for Best Director of the 2019 Flathead Lake International Cinemafest, at the 2018 International Thai Film Festival and others. His 2009 film Oceans Within Us was named Best Short Film at the Kyiv International Short Film Festival and Best Short-Length Film of 2011 by the Ukrainian Producer Association and Association of Cinema.

His movie The Perception was named Best Film at both 2018 Mediterranean Film Festival Cannes and the 2019 Fusion Film Festival, Best Thriller at the 2018 Oniros Film Awards and Best US Made Feature Film at the 2018 Prince of Prestige Academy Awards.

His second film, Blesscode, also won awards for Best Film Script and Best Short Film at industry film festivals.

Since moving to the United States, Jensen has collaborated with Khalid, Jay Z, Bryson Tiller, Normani and others. He is a member of the Ukrainian Film Academy, the Union of Filmmakers of Ukraine and the Producers Guild of Ukraine.

Biography 

Jensen Noen was born in Poltava, Ukraine. In 2009 he moved to Kyiv and joined a Down & Dirty rock band as a guitar and keyboard player. He began producing videos for MTV; he also directed several television shows. Later, he began directing commercials and music videos and collaborated with top Eastern European artists and labels.

In 2014, Jensen relocated to Los Angeles, California. In 2018 he completed a feature film, The Perception, featuring Eric Roberts and Nick Bateman

Music videos and commercials 
Jensen has collaborated with Demi Lovato, Falling in Reverse, I Prevail, Jay Z, Bryson Tiller, Khalid, Normani, Maxwell, Duke Dumont, Emmure, Crown the Empire, Asking Alexandria, I See Stars, Issues, and with Eastern European pop band Ruki Vverh!). He has also directed videos for RCA, Virgin Records, Roadrunner Records, Atlantic Records, Sumerian Records, and Rise Records and directed and produced commercials.

Films and cinematography 
Jensen's career includes numerous short films. Most notably, he directed the award-winning shorts "Oceans Within Us" and "Blesscode" in Europe. Once he moved to the United States he continued his film career with "Observer", which allowed Jensen to blend his love of film and music video. Jensen's film "Gambit", about a character from the Marvel universe, starring Nick Bateman, received outstanding reviews and viral word of mouth that pushed Jensen and Nick into the industry limelight. The success of Gambit led to their next collaboration, The Perception. The Perception, Jensen's first feature-length movie, was selected by numerous international film festivals. The European and Asian theatrical release is anticipated in the beginning of 2019.

The Perception won “Best Feature Film Director” from the ITFF Film & Entertainment Industry, “Best Feature Film Director” and “Best Screenplay” from the South Film and Arts Academy Festival, “Best Trailer” from the Pitch to Screen Film Awards in 2018, Best US made feature film from Prince of Prestige Awards 2018, and Best thriller from Oniros Film Awards 2018.

Filmography

Films
Play for Keeps, 2021 (TV)
The Perception, 2019 (feature)
Gambit, 2017 (short)
Observer, 2016 (short)
Blesscode, 2013 (short)
Oceans Within Us, 2009 (short)

Music videos

2023
"Deep End" by I Prevail
"Still Alive" by Demi Lovato
"Seventy Thorns" by Kim Dracula
"Watch the World Burn" by Falling in Reverse
"Welcome to Horrorwood" by Ice Nine Kills

2022
"Paranoid (Crash & Burn)" by Pop Evil
"There's Fear in Letting Go" by I Prevail
"Werewolf" by Motionless in White
"Self-Destruction" by I Prevail
"The Shower Scene" by Ice Nine Kills
"Voices in My Head" by Falling in Reverse
"Wake Me Up (When This Nightmare's Over)" by Simple Plan
"Face to Face" by Pony Wave
"I'm Not" by Zero 9:36
"CHAOS" by Hollywood Undead
"Ruin My Life" by Simple Plan
"Zombified" by Falling in Reverse

2021
"The Antidote" by Simple Plan
"Funeral Derangements" by Ice Nine Kills
"Rainy Day" by Ice Nine Kills
"Black Leather" by Call Me Karizma
"Black Hole" by We Came as Romans
"Assault & Batteries" by Ice Nine Kills
"Hip To Be Scared" by Ice Nine Kills
"Secret Garden" by Spiritbox
"Big Bands" by AYLEK$
"I'm Not A Vampire (Revamped)" by Falling in Reverse

2020
"Dying to Live" by Sevendust
"Nails" by Call Me Karizma
"BLURRY (Out of Place)" by Crown the Empire
"The Drug in Me is Reimagined" by Falling in Reverse

2019
"Popular Monster" by Falling in Reverse
"Flexin" by Issues
"The Violence" by Asking Alexandria
"Monster (Under My Bed)" by Call Me Karizma

2017
"Nowhere Left to Sink" by Like Moths to Flames
"Into the Fire" by Asking Alexandria
"Trapped" by KORR-A

2016
"Calm Snow" by I See Stars
"Decisions" by Now I See
"Everybody Get Down" by KORR-A
"Cali Love" by KORR-A
"Blindfolds" by Rilan

2015
"One Shot" by Multiverse
"Prisoners of War" by Crown the Empire
"Heart of Glass" by KORR-A
"Union" by Vo'Devil Stokes 
"Mood for Love" by The Gitas
"Brust" by Majentta
"A Gift A Curse" by Emmure

2014
"I Will Never Lose My Way" by Down & Dirty
"Wind Inside" by NUTEKI
"Skeletons" by Heartist

2013
"Move It" by Down & Dirty

Awards 
 2022 – Best War Short Film, "Wake Me Up", By Jensen Noen | South Film and Arts Academy Festival 
 2022 – Best Director In A Short Film, Jensen Noen / Wake Me Up | South Film and Arts Academy Festival 
 2022 – Best Music Video, "Falling In Reverse - Zombified", Director Jensen Noen | Falcon International Film Festival 
 2021 – Best Music Video, Falling In Reverse - “I’m Not A Vampire (Revamped)”, Director Jensen Noen | London Independent Film Awards – London, United Kingdom
 2021 – Best Music Video, Falling In Reverse - “I’m Not A Vampire (Revamped)”, Director Jensen Noen | Falcon International Film Festival – London, United Kingdom
 2021 – Best Music Video, Falling In Reverse - “I’m Not A Vampire (Revamped)”, Director Jensen Noen | Open Window International Film Challenge – Bengal, India
 2021 – Best Music Video, Falling In Reverse - “I’m Not A Vampire (Revamped)”, Director Jensen Noen | The Hollywood Boulevard Film Festival – Hollywood, United States
 2021 – Best Music Video, Falling In Reverse - “I’m Not A Vampire (Revamped)”, Director Jensen Noen | The Canadian Diversity Film Festival – Ontario, Canada
 2021 – Best Music Video, Falling In Reverse - “I’m Not A Vampire (Revamped)”, Director Jensen Noen | Los Angeles Film Awards – Los Angeles, United States
 2018 – Best US made feature film - The Perception (Director: Jensen Noen), at Prince of Prestige Awards - Apopka, FL, United States
 2018 – Best thriller - The Perception (Director: Jensen Noen), at Oniros Film Awards - Aosta, Italy
 2018 – Best Foreign Feature Film Director for The Perception at ITFF Film & Entertainment Industry
 2018 – Best Feature Film Director and Best Screenplay for The Perception at the South Film and Arts Academy Festival
 2018 – Best Trailer for The Perception at Pitch to Screen Film Awards
 2017 – Honored artist of various arts of Ukraine - Film Director and Producer
 2017 – Honorary Award for his excellent art level and high viewer interest for Gambit – The Association of Producers of Ukraine
 2016 – “I See Stars – Calm Snow” - Nomination: Best Music Video of the Year by the version of Alternative Press Music Awards
 2016 – First-degree diploma, a harmonic realization of music and picture in the film "Observer" and his producer professionalism - The Association of Producers of Ukraine
 2015 – Short Film Blesscode - Film Festival Winner In the nomination ‘Short film’ at Independent International Internet Short
 2015 – Honorary Award for best film director and producer - The Association of Producers of Ukraine
 2014 – Best Producer - Association at Cannes Film Marketplace by the Head of The Association of Producers of Ukraine
 2013 – Honorary Award for Personal Achievement - Institute of Producing of Ukraine
 2013 – Short film “Blesscode” - "Best Short Film Script" by the Association of Producers of Ukraine
 2012 – First Place Amateur Cinema Art - Kyiv Popular Arts Festival
 2011 – Oceans Within Us - Best short-length film of 2011 by the Ukrainian Producer Association and Association of Cinema
 2009 – Oceans Within Us, the grand prize winner at Kyiv International Short Film Festival (KISFF)

References

External links 
 Website 
 
 Vimeo

1987 births
Living people
Mass media people from Poltava
Ukrainian cinematographers
Ukrainian emigrants to the United States